The Hohtürli (Swiss German, literally means High Little Door) is a high Alpine hiking pass of the Bernese Alps.

The track forms part of the Alpine Pass Route, a long-distance hiking trail across Switzerland between Sargans and Montreux, and the Hohtürli is the highest pass crossed by that route.

See also
List of mountain passes in Switzerland

References

External links
Hohtürli Pass on Via Alpina web site
Hohtürli on Hikr web site

Mountain passes of the Alps
Mountain passes of Switzerland
Mountain passes of the canton of Bern